Dana is an unincorporated community and census-designated place (CDP) in Henderson County, North Carolina, United States. Its population was 3,329 as of the 2010 census.

History
A post office called Dana has been in operation since 1892. The community was named for Dana Hadley, the son of the original owner of the town site.

Geography
The eastern half of the community drains to the Hungry River and is part of the Green River–Broad River–Congaree River–Santee River system flowing to the Atlantic Ocean, while the western half of Dana flows towards Mud Creek, part of the French Broad River–Tennessee River–Mississippi River system flowing to the Gulf of Mexico.

Demographics

Notes

Census-designated places in North Carolina
Census-designated places in Henderson County, North Carolina
Unincorporated communities in North Carolina
Unincorporated communities in Henderson County, North Carolina